Phyllota is an Australian genus from the family Fabaceae, a biological grouping of flowering plants.

Species
Phyllota comprises the following species:
 Phyllota barbata Benth.
 Phyllota diffusa (Hook.f.) F.Muell.
 Phyllota gracilis Turcz.
 Phyllota grandiflora Benth.
 Phyllota humifusa Benth.
 Phyllota luehmannii F.Muell.
 Phyllota phylicoides (DC.) Benth.
 Phyllota pleurandroides F.Muell.
 Phyllota remota J.H.Willis
 Phyllota squarrosa (DC.) Benth.

Species names with uncertain taxonomic status
The status of the following species is unresolved:
 Phyllota aspera Benth.
 Phyllota baueri Benth.
 Phyllota billardieri Benth.
 Phyllota comosa Benth.
 Phyllota georgei Hemsl.
 Phyllota humilis S.Moore
 Phyllota lycopodioides S.Moore
 Phyllota pilosa Benth.
 Phyllota sturtii Benth.
 Phyllota villosa Turcz.

References

External links
 

Mirbelioids
Fabales of Australia
Fabaceae genera